Kandar-e Mohammadi (also Romanized as Kandar-e Moḩammadī) is a village in Sigar Rural District, in the Central District of Lamerd County, Fars Province, Iran. At the 2006 census, its population was 361, in 78 families.

References 

Populated places in Lamerd County